is a 2008 Japanese historical drama television series. It is the 47th NHK taiga drama. It aired from January 6 to December 14, 2008, and ran a total of 50 episodes. The drama chronicles the life of Tenshō-in, based on Tomiko Miyao's 1984 novel . Viewership for Atsuhime was high; the series received an average rating of 24.5%, the highest rating received by a taiga drama since Hideyoshi in 1996.

Background
The taiga drama is based on Tomiko Miyao's novel Tenshō-in Atsuhime. The protagonist is Tenshō-in (Princess Atsu), the wife of Tokugawa Iesada, the thirteenth shōgun of the Edo shogunate. It is the seventh taiga drama to feature a female lead, coming just two years after Kōmyō ga Tsuji in 2006.

Following Yoshitsune in 2005, this is Miyao's second work to be turned into a taiga drama. Following Shinsengumi!, it is also the second taiga drama taking place at the end of the Edo shogunate.

The character of Tenshō-in was previously taken up in the 2003 Fuji Television series Ōoku (starring Kanno Miho).

The lead role is performed by Aoi Miyazaki, for which it is her first Taiga drama lead. She is also the youngest to play the lead role. In May 2008, she won a Galaxy Award for her work in this role.

The first half of the story predominantly takes place in Kagoshima prefecture, and as such many of the actors and music coordinators are from Kagoshima.

Cast
Okatsu – Atsuhime – Tenshōin: Honoka Nagai – Chinami Iwamoto – Aoi Miyazaki

Shimazu clan
Hideki Takahashi as Shimazu Nariakira
Yūichirō Yamaguchi as Shimazu Tadayuki/ Shimazu Hisamitsu
Hiroyuki Nagato as Shimazu Narioki
Mayo Suzukaze as Oyura (Narioki's concubine, mother of Hisamitsu)
Kimiko Yo as Hisahime
Nakagawa Shingo as Shimazu Tadayoshi (2nd)
Yuriko Yoshitaka as Otetsu
Masaki Kaji as Shimazu Ukon
Kondo Takatada as Shimazu Hironosuke
Motokawa Ransho as Shimazu Tokunosuke
Aka Marino as Osada
Ebisu Reina as Ohiro
Watanabe Takuto as Shimazu Torajumaru (Chujiro)
Iida Shion as Teruhime

Imaizumi Shimazu family
Kyōzō Nagatsuka as Shimazu Tadatake
Kanako Higuchi as Oyuki
Yoshinori Okada as Shimazu Tadayuki
Sakai Kazuhisa as Tadayuki (child)
Sumie Sasaki as Kikumoto
Yasukiyo Umeno as Kurikawa Mochitsune
Yūsuke Shōji as Takuma Harumichi
Tanahashi Chiyo as Mine
Kobayashi Asako as Shino
Kono Yasuro as Shimazu Tadafuyu
Fujisaki Go as Tadafuyu (child)

Shōguns clan
Masato Sakai as Tokugawa Iesachi/ Tokugawa Iesada, the 13th shōgun
Shōta Matsuda as Tokugawa Yoshitomi/ Tokugawa Iemochi, the 14th shōgun
Takehiro Hira as Hitotsubashi Yoshinobu/ Tokugawa Yoshinobu, the last shōgun
Shigeru Saiki as Tokugawa Ieyoshi, the 12th shōgun
Reo Yoshitake as Tayasu Kamenosuke/ Tokugawa Iesato
Kisaichi Yuta as Iesato (young)
Kobayashi Kaito as Kamenosuke (child)

Daimyōs
Tōru Emori as Tokugawa Nariaki
Kenichi Yajima as Matsudaira Yoshinaga

Elite members of Shimazu clan
Eita as Kimotsuki Naogorō / Komatsu Tatewaki
Mikijirō Hira as Zusho Hirosato
Ikki Sawamura as Komatsu Kiyomichi
Rie Tomosaka as Ochika
Natsuki Harada as Okoto, Komatsu Tatewaki's concubine
Takaaki Enoki as Kimotsuki Kaneyoshi
Takahashi Taira as Komatsu Kiyonao
Nakamura Shunga as Yasuchiyo (Kiyonao as Child)
Nakayama Katsumi as Shimazu Bungo
Asanuma Shinpei as Shimazu Bungo
Tengenji Ryu as Shimazu Shosho
Ito Hiromu as Komatsu Kiyoatsu
Minami Kazue as Masa
Misawa Akemi as Kinu
Nagasawa Dari as Shimazu Hoki
Okamoto Kotaro as Kawakami Chikugo
Ryuji Yamamoto as Tateyama Buhee
Sakabe Fumiaki as Shimazu Hisakaze
Honda Kiyozumi as Niro Hisanori
Uehara Kensuke as Tanimura Masatake

Low members of Shimazu clan
Yukiyoshi Ozawa as Saigō Kichinosuke / Saigō Takamori
Taizo Harada as Ōkubo Shōsuke / Ōkubo Toshimichi
Koji Matoba as Arima Shinshichi
Kyoko Maya as Fuku
Shinya Owada as Okubo Toshiya
Hiroki Miyake as Izachi Masaharu
Hiroyuki Hirayama as Arima Shunsai
Momosuke Mizutani as Saigo Judo
Mitsutoshi Shundo as Oyama Tsunayoshi
Koukichi Tanoue as Arimura Yusuke
Yuya Endo as Arimura Jizaemon
Kenji Takechi as Narahara Kihachiro

Ōoku 大奥
Keiko Matsuzaka as Ikushima　幾島, the tutor of Atsuhime
Izumi Inamori as 　瀧山
Atsuko Takahata as Honjuin
Tomoko Nakajima as Shigeno
Yumiko Takahashi as Karahashi
Yumi Iwai as Utahashi
Mayu Tsuruta as Oshiga

Ladies-in-waiting
Yuka Itaya as Hirokawa
Aiko Sato as Onoshima
Tokie Hidari as Takayama
Sawako Kitahara as Fujino
Miho Matsuda as Yuki
Yoshimi Oishi as Hisa

Shōguns advisors
Masao Kusakari as Abe Masahiro
Takurō Tatsumi as Hotta Masayoshi
Nakamura Baijaku II as Ii Naosuke
Akira Shirai as Andō Nobumasa
Kazuyuki Matsuzawa as Matsudaira Tadakata
Seishirō Nishida as Itakura Katsukiyo
Tōgo Shimura as Matsudaira Katamori

Shogunate retainers
Kinya Kitaōji as Katsu Kaishū
Ryō Katsuji as John Manjiro

Imperial family
Hideki Tōgi as Emperor Kōmei
Terunosuke Takezai as Prince Arisugawa Taruhito
Maki Horikita as Kazunomiya Chikako
Mayumi Wakamura as Kangyōin

Kugyōs
Shumpūtei Koasa as Konoe Tadahiro
Tsurutarō Kataoka as Iwakura Tomomi

Others
Hiroshi Tamaki as Sakamoto Ryōma
Jumpei Suzuki as Katsura Kogorō

Production
Production Credits
Original – Tomiko Miyao (Tenshō-in Atsuhime, Kōdansha, 1984)
 The author of the original story, Tomiko Miyao, was born in Kōchi. In 1973, she received the Dazai Osamu Award with “Kai”. In 1979, her work Ichigen no koto won the renowned Naoki Prize. The novel Tenshōin Atsuhime depicts the life of Atsuhime, who had been lost in the flow of history, and was discovered through Miyao's own research. The work Tenshōin Atsuhime is considered to be monumental among her works. This is the second time for NHK to create a taiga drama series after Yoshitsune in 2005.
Script – Kumiko Tabuchi
 Kumiko Tabuchi was born in Shimane Prefecture. She has produced scripts for Sakura, Tsuma no Sotsugyōshiki, and Diamond no Koi, among others. She is known for vividly illustrating women who positively face their lives. She offers scripts in a wide range of areas such as films, musicals, rakugo, play, and kyōgen. This is her first script for Taiga drama.
Music – Ryō Yoshimata
 In the process of creating the music for this drama, Yoshimata went back after 30 years to his hometown Kagoshima and stayed there for three weeks. While meeting his old friends and watching Sakurajima, he was touched by the warmness, toughness, and generosity of the homeland. His deep feelings for his homeland became the basis of the 47 songs created for this drama.
Titling – Kinko Kikuchi
Historical research – Manabu Ōishi
Narrator – Tomoko Naraoka
Production coordinator – Motohiko Sano
Casting – Mineyo Satō

The usual procedure of a taiga drama production would have one-third of the expected number of scripts finished before shooting begins. Afterwards, audience reception is taken into account as the rest of the series is written.

Plot
The episodes largely fall into two parts. The first half of the series revolves around Atsuhime's life in Satsuma. The latter half mainly proceeds with the politics around the Tokugawa Shogunate after she moved to Edo to marry Tokugawa Iesada.

Episode 1: Child of Destiny (1/6/2008)
The episode starts off in Satsuma in 1835, 20 years prior to the arrival of the Black Ships led by Matthew C. Perry. People in Satsuma are excited by the arrival of the heir to the domain, Shimazu Nariakira, from Edo. Meanwhile, a long-awaited daughter is born in one of the cadet families of Shimazu clan, the Imaizumi Shimazu family. The father of the girl, Shimazu Tadatake, and the mother, Oyuki, name her "Katsu", wishing the child's happiness. Okatsu grew up as a tomboy, much stronger than her brothers, yet is warm-hearted and full of curiosity.

Before long, the Satsuma Domain picks up its efforts at strict financial reform under the guidance of Karō Zusho Hirosato. Saigō Kichinosuke (Saigō Takamori), witnessing the farmers' harsh life, appeals to Tadatake. Hirosato receives this news and punishes Tadatake for allowing farmers to express their dissent, for it suggests lenient treatment of farmers on Tadatake's part. Okatsu, unable to comprehend Hirosato's action of punishing those who support farmers, recklessly decides to charge over to Hirosato's house with her close friend Kimotsuke Naogorō (Komatsu Tatewaki) to demand a reason.

Episode 2: Vow at Sakurajima (1/13/2008)
By restraining himself and devoting his effort to the domain's financial reform, Tadatake manages to avoid punishment. With Karō Zusho Hirosato's reform steadily gaining results, the domain's debt, which at one point reached 5 million Ryō (Japanese coin), is cleared. Meanwhile, the lives of farmers and samurai become extremely difficult, and their plight fuels animosity among young samurai like Saigō Kichnosuke and Ōkubo Shōsuke (Ōkubo Toshimichi) toward Daimyō Shimazu Narioki, who employed Zusho and his concubine, Oyura. Amid hostilities, Shimazu Nariakira's children have died one after another. What is more, a doll, supposedly used for a curse, is found under the room of these children. The hatred toward Oyura and Zusho peaks within the domain. With this as a backdrop, Okatsu is invited by Zusho to his house. She visits him with Kimotsuki Naogorō. In his house, Zusho tells Okatsu that he wants to share ideas with her before he goes off to Edo. Subsequently, Zusho goes to Edo but is suspected by Rōjū Abe Masahiro of illegal trade. To protect Satsuma from repercussions, he kills himself by taking poison.

Episode 3: Satsuma Divide (1/20/2008)
In Satsuma, Oyura—Narioki's concubine—is trying to make her son heir to the clan and antagonizing the group that stood by Nariakira. Okatsu is curious about the domain's politics, but Tadatake chides her that politics is not something children should be involved in. In connection with the family quarrel, Ōkubo Tadasuke (Toshimichi) is punished by the domain. Okatsu, who heard the news from Naogorō, worries about Tadasuke's family and starts to bring in food to the family from her home. Tadasuke is deeply moved by the kindness of Okatsu, Naogorō, and Saigō. Having seen Tadasuke's sisters busy with their side jobs, Okatsu tries to give her expensive comb and hair ornament to Tadasuke's mother, Fuku. Fuku, however, flatly refuses to accept them. To Okatsu, who is worried if her kindness hurt Fuku, Oyuki explains about the pride of women in Satsuma. Meanwhile, Nariakira, who succeeded as the head of the clan with the help of rōjū Abe, enters Satsuma with huge ambitions.

Episode 4: A Wise Lord Angered (1/27/2008)
In the wake of the family quarrel, the new clan head Nariakira arrives at Satsuma from Edo and takes the lead in the reform of rice prices. The group who sided with Tadayuki (Shimazu Hisamitsu) fears how Nariakira is going to punish its members, but he does not punish anybody. Saigō and other young samurai become frustrated because Ōkubo, who should have been pardoned right away, has not received clemency. Okatsu and Naogorō go over to Komatsu Kiyomichi and Ochika's place and ask about Nariakira's true intention. Kiyomichi, however, says that faith in Nariakira is the only way of loyalty, but this does not convince Okatsu. Meanwhile, Nariakira invites the Imaizumi family to the castle to meet members of branch families. Tadatake subjects Okatsu to practice in a ladylike manner to avoid embarrassment in the meeting. On the day of Okatsu's visit, Okatsu intensely presses Nariakira on why Ōkubo has not been pardoned. Nariakira, who has a different purpose for the meeting, is amused by Okatsu's honest yet serious attitude and comes to have an interest in her.

Episode 5: The Best Man in Japan (2/3/2008)
Japanese history books have been sent to Okatsu's place from Nariakira. Kikumoto tells Okatsu, who were overjoyed and busily reading the books, that the happiness of women lies in marriage. Meanwhile, Shimazu Tadayuki comes with news to Tadatake that his son fell in love at first sight with Okatsu and that he wants to marry her. Fearing the risk that Nariakira might misunderstand the connection between his family and Tadayuki's family, Tadatake, however, could not view the marriage proposal in a positive light.

Naogorō, who heard the story from Tadayuki, is gravely shaken. He asks Okatsu her thoughts on marriage, but she only tells him that she wishes to marry the best man in Japan. In the meantime, John Manjirō, who has just returned from the US, is invited to Satsuma. Naogorō meets him and is inspired by his story that marriage in the US is based on the agreement between the individuals, unlike in Japan, where it is decided by the two families. This gives him courage to openly tell Tadatake about his feelings for Okatsu. But the next day finds Tadatake called up to the castle. Against his fear that the proposal news might have reached Nariakira, he is informed of Nariakira's plan for adopting Okatsu.

Episode 6: Women’s Path (2/10/2008)
Nariakira's plan to adopt Okatsu has stirred Tadatake. Kikumoto, who had raised her since she was little, is overjoyed by this honor. Taken by surprised, Okatsu, however, is hesitant, not knowing what to do. It is only certain that she could not turn down the offer. Naogorō, who has learned the news, grows desperate, for it would be impossible to marry Okatsu once she is adopted. Emotionally charged, he starts to cry at Saigō's home, but Saigō's compassion cheers him up.

In the overjoyed Imaizumi family, Oyuki detects strangeness in Kikumoto's behavior. Okatsu, in the meantime, implores Tadatake for permission to have an audience with Nariakira to plead for explanations. On the morning of Okatsu's visit to the castle, Kikumoto presses on Okatsu saying “A woman’s life is like walking on a long one-way path. It is a dishonor to turn back the path."

In response to Okatsu's straightforward question, Nariakira explains that he wants to adopt her because she reminds him of his mother. Having learned his brimming affection for her, Okatsu finally comes to a decision to become his daughter. When she returns home, however, there is news waiting that Kikumoto has killed herself.

Episode 7: The Father's Tears (2/17/2008)
Okatsu is gravely shaken from Kikumoto's taking her own life. What is more, she starts to hold ill feelings for her father, for he got rid of Kikumoto's body as if treating criminals. That night, Okatsu learns from Oyuki that Kikumoto left a will. In it, she wrote that her choice to kill herself was motivated by her wish to erase the blemish that someone of a low status like herself raised Okatsu, who is now facing a bright future. Okatsu realized Kikumoto's considerations and expectations for her future and learned the true meaning of becoming Nariakira's daughter.

Meanwhile, news from Nagasaki Dejima comes into Edo that an American naval fleet demanding trade with Japan is approaching. Leaders in the Tokugawa shogunate face difficulty in how it should be dealt. Nariaki supports the sweeping expulsion of foreigners from Japan and does not yield. Facing this, Nariakira comes to a realization the urgency of adopting Okatsu to implement his political scheme in this political turmoil.

While the day Okatsu moves to Tsurumaru Castle closes in, Tadatake all of a sudden started to devote himself to constructing batteries for guarding the coastlines, behaving as if he has no interest in the adoption affair. Finally, the day for Okatsu to leave for the castle arrives.

Episode 8: How to be a Princess (2/24/2008)
Okatsu moves into Tsurumaru Castle, but has a hard time fitting into its restrictive customs. She is belittled by Hirokawa and other women serving under her as a girl from a branch family and starts to take a negligent attitude.

Okubo Shōsuke is released from the house arrest of three years, and this makes Naogorō and Saigō feel relieved. Okatsu wants to share the joy but feels lonely when she finds herself at a high, distant social rank which prohibits them to even exchange words with her.

Episode 36: Satsuma or Tokugawa (9/7/2008)
While the Edo group and the Kyōto group inside the Ōoku continue to antagonize to each other, little by little Kazunomiya and Iemochi became closer. Tensho-in was finally feeling relieved.

Then, commanding a force of a few thousand soldiers, Hisamitsu left for Kyōto with the intention of receiving the Emperor's approval for reforming the Tokugawa Shōgunate.
Meanwhile, suspicion that Tenshō-in might be involved in the plot mounted in Edo.

The message that the Satsuma force headed to Edo reached Ōoku, and distrust directed to Tenshō-in further deepened. Amid this, even Iemochi, who had been on Tenshō-in's side, came to suspect her. Crushed from everyone's distrust, Tenshō-in started to burn her personal items that she brought with her from Satsuma. Seeing this, Iemochi realized how much she is hurt by his distrust and apologized to her that he would not doubt her from now on.

Episode 37: Parting of Friendship (9/14/2008)
The Satsuma force led by Hisamitsu entered Edo accompanying an Imperial envoy. His aim was to reform the Tokugawa Shogunate. Meanwhile, Tenshō-in was anxious if Tatewaki also came to Edo accompanying Hisamitsu. Against Hisamitsu's wish, the negotiation between the envoy and Rōjū came to a dead end. Hisamitsu became extremely impatient and ordered Ōkubo to threaten the Rōjū side by force. While Tatewaki felt awkward toward such a forceful approach taken by his comrades, Satsuma succeeded in pressing on the reform plan. Tenshō-in, who was upset at Satsuma's cowardly move, sought an audience with Hisamitsu to ascertain his true intentions. With her unsuccessful meeting with Hisamitsu, she failed to exchange words with Tatewaki, who was in the company of Hisamitsu. Regretting this sour reunion with Tatewaki, Tenshō-in asked Iemochi to invite Tatewaki to Ōoku. Playing igo like when they were still in Satsuma, Tenshō-in and Tatewaki engaged in friendly conversation and promised to each other that each would try their best to defend their own people: the Tokugawa clan for Tenshō-in and the people of Satsuma for Tatewaki.

Episode 38: Heart of the Mother-In-Law, Heart of the Wife (9/21/2008)
A letter from Tatewaki recounting what really took place in Namamugi Incident reached Tenshō-in. Having learned the truth, she maintained that the Shogunate, together with Satsuma, needed to apologize to Britain. Meanwhile, in Kyoto, the Chōshū group came to dominate the political scene, defeating the Satsuma group and its leaders Shimazu Hisamitsu and Iwakura Tomomi.

Amid this confusion, an Imperial Envoy came from Kyoto to Edo, demanding Iemochi to visit the capital and to implement a policy that would exclude foreigners. Upon discussing the matter with Tenshō-in, he made up his mind to tell the emperor in person that the implementation of such a policy would be unattainable. Princess Kazu, however, strongly opposed Iemochi's decision.

Sakamoto Ryōma visited Katsu Rintarō. Although he initially intended to kill Lintarō, after discussion, he changed his mind and asked Lintarō to become his mentor. In the meantime in Satsuma, Tatewaki got promoted to the position of Karō.

In Edo castle, where Iemochi's departure was looming close, Tenshō-in and Lintaro argued with each other whether Iemochi should take a land route or a sea route. Meanwhile, Kazunomiya, who learned that Tenshō-in pushed Iemochi to visit the capital, came to harbor strong hostility toward Tenshō-in.

Episode 39: Buring Satsuma (9/28/2008)
The news that Shōgun Iemochi arrived at Kyoto came to Ōoku and lightened her mind. Kazunomiya, on the other hand, worried about Iemochi and became more restless. Her fear became true when radicals led by a Chōshū Domain group supporting the expulsion of foreigners dominated the Imperial Court in Kyoto. Mired in the quandary, Iemochi was forced to promise to the court the enforcement of expelling foreigners.

Tenshōin, who blamed herself for urging Iemochi's visit to Kyoto, asked Kazunomiya to convince his brother, Emperor Kōmei to arrange Iemochi's return to Edo, but Kazunomiya adamantly refused it. Tenshōin sent Katsu Kaishū to Iemochi, who fell ill from the exhaustion from the trip to Kyōto. Through the conversation with Katsu, Iemochi regained his spirits and learned his board perspective on the matter.

In the meantime, Chōshū Domain carried out the expulsion of foreigners, and word reached Satsuma. Hisamitsu and Tatewaki realized that war was imminent.

In Kyōto, Iemochi was permitted to return to Edo with Kazunomiya's plea to the emperor. Tenshōin expressed her gratitude to Kazunomiya. Then, the news came in that the British Royal Navy staying in Yokohama headed to Satsuma. The Anglo-Satsuma War was about to start.

Episode 40: Son Taking the Field (10/05/08)
Saigō, who had been exiled, came back. At the gathering where Saigō and his old friends reunited, Tatewaki met a geisho, Okoto.
The Chōshū domain, which is bent on regaining its political leverage in the capital, suddenly attacked the Imperial Palace. This is known as the Kinmon Incident. Tatewaki, who led the Satsuma forces, joined forces with the Shōgunate, along with Yoshinobu, and defeat the enemy forces. In the meantime, in Ōoku, Takiyama advised Tenshōin to let the shōgun have a concubine who could bear his heir, for she was purely concerned with the future of the Tokugawa clan and desired to consolidate the foundations of the Shugunate's rule. Tenshōin, however, did not want to tear up the intimate relationship between Kazunomiya and Iemochi and flatly rejected the idea.

The Naval School established by Katsu Kaishū was about to be shut down by the shōgunate, suffering the repercussions of the Kinmon Incident. Katsu sent his disciple Sakamoto Ryōma to Tatewaki, who was the karo of the Satsuma domain, to ask him to take care of the students.
Meanwhile, in Edo Castle, Kazunomiya showed signs of pregnancy, and the entire Ōoku was delighted with the news. Kangyōin—Kazunomiya's mother—and Tenshōin both shared the excitement of expecting a grandchild. As it turned out, however, Kazunomiya's pregnancy proved false.

Atsuhime Travel Sketches is a series of sketches that is assigned to the last few minutes of each episode. In each sketch, a few historical sites relevant to the drama are introduced with a short video clip and brief comment.

Sketch 1: Atsuhime’s Homeland
The  <Kagoshima City>
 Kagoshima City, Kagoshima Prefecture, is the hometown of Atsuhime. It was a castle town of the 770, 000 koku Satsuma Domain. In 1835, Okatsu (later Atsuhime) was born in one of the Shimazu branch families, the Imaizumi Shimazu family, as the eldest daughter. Her birthhouse was located in the area close to Kagoshima Castle, where upper-class samurai lived.
 Ibusuki, Kagoshima is located 40 km south of Kagoshima City. The northern section of the city was the Imaizumi Shimazu family’s territory. In the Imaizumi family’s residence site still remains a chōzubachi that is known to have been used by Atsuhime.
Direction to the Imaizumi family’s residence site: JR Satsuma-Imaizumi Station

Sketch 2: Naogorō’s Homeland
Komatsu Tatewaki Statue <Kagoshima City>
 Kagoshima City, Kagoshima Prefecture is the hometown of Kimotsuki Naogorō (later Komatsu Tatewaki). Naogorō was born in 1835, the same year as Atsuhime was born. He was the third son of Kimotsuki Kaneyoshi and grew up close to the birthhouse of Atsuhime.
 At the age of 23, Naogorō was adopted by the Komatsu family and afterwards became politically influential in the tumultuous period prior to the Meiji Restoration as karō of the Satsuma Domain.

Sketch 3: The Strongest Samuraihood
 Izumi, Kagoshima, is the birthplace of the Shimazu clan. The first head of the clan, Shimazu Tadahisa, established the castle in the Kamakura period and built the clan’s foundation. In Kannōji Temple, the first five heads of the clan are resting peacefully. During that time, travelers and shipments passing through Izumi were strictly searched, for the location was on the border between Satsuma and Higo. On the foot of the hills still remain numerous residences of samurai.

Sketch 4: Nariakira’s Achievements
 Shimazu Nariakira established the first modern factories at a location called Iso 5 km northeast of central Kagoshima city. With the incorporation of western technology, great efforts were made at the development of ironworks and shipbuilding, along with the foundation of the glass handcraft industry and the cotton mill industry. In Senganen, Shimzau’s villa, Nariakira succeeded in lighting a gas lamp.

Sketch 5: Manjirō’s Homeland
 Nakahama (Tosashimizu, Kōchi), located on the eastside of Ashizuri Peninsula, is the homeland of Nakahama Manjirō. Manjirō, who lost his father when he was young, started working early to make ends meet. It was at the age of 14, when he was cast away during his fishing trip. He was saved by an American whaling ship and spent 10 years in the foreign land of America. The knowledge that Manjirō brought from abroad gave a significant impact on later developments in Japan.

Sketch 6: Satsuma’s 
 Kajiya Town, located on Kōtsuki River in Kagoshima, produced many leaders of the new Meiji government such as Saigō Takamori and Ōkubo Toshimichi. The Satsuma Domain had a unique educational system named . The territory was divided roughly into 30 areas, and within each area the senior educated the junior. Saigō and Ōkubo were also educated by teachings of their seniors.

Sketch 7: The Port Town Deeply Connected to Atsuhime
The town has a good natural port and was busy in trade with China and Ryūkyū in the past. As a consequence, however, the town was exposed to the threat of foreign ships many times. Lord Nariakira reinforced battery fortifications around the area to strengthen its defense.

Sketch 8: The Arrival of the Black Ships
 During the Edo period, Uraga was an entrance for many ships which visited the country. Back then, the port was lined with ship merchants. Many Inari shrines built for business success still remain in the city. In 1853, four black ships commanded by Commodore Matthew C. Perry appeared in Uraga Bay. Seeking the opening of Japan, he lands on Kuri Beach. The arrival of the Black Ships heralded the beginning of the turmoil leading up to the Meiji Restoration and also radically changed the fate of Atsuhime.

Sketch 9: The Castle where Atsuhime was Born
 Kagoshima Castle is called "Crane Castle" and has been cherished by many, for it is formed in a shape that appears like a crane spreading its wings. The front side has the main gate called Gorō Gate. Passing through the gate, a modestly constructed main palace used to welcomed visitors. It's been said that one corner of the building was assigned to Ōoku. The stone foundations still contain traces of bullets from the Satsuma Rebellion. In the castle that witnessed the tumultuous period of Japan, Okatsu took the name Atsuhime.

Sketch 10: Achievements of Tokugawa Nariaki
 Mito flourished during the Edo period as the castle town of the Mito Han, one of the Tokugawa Gosanke. The 9th daimyō of the domain, Tokugawa Nariaki aggressively carried out reform. He also encouraged both literary and military arts and established the school Kōdōkan and the relaxing place for samurai Kairakuen. Even after the family headship was handed over to his son, he remained on the political scene as a leading figure of the  group, which supported the expulsion of foreigners from Japan.

Sketch 11: The Town with a Flagrance of Antiquity
 Located at the southeast of Satsuma Peninsula, in current Minamisatsuma, Kagoshima, Bōnotsu Town had been known, inside and outside of the country, as a sea entrance to Japan. It is said that Ganjin, a renowned Buddhist monk, arrived here in 753f from China and passed on knowledge about incense. There is a historical record recounting that merchants of Bōnotsu brought in the incense called  from Agarwood to the Shimazu clan.
 It has been said that the activity to burn incense for entertainment caught on and expanded to the four corners of the country during the Edo period.

Sketch 12: My Homeland, Sakurajima
 Sakurajima is one of the most active volcanoes in the world. In particular, the eruption in 1914 caused enormous damage to the region. Due to thermal effects created in the volcanic area, public bathhouses in Kagoshima, Kagoshima use hot spring water. At the foothills of Sakurajima grow local produce such as Sakurajima Daikon and Sakurajima Small Mikan. The volcano that Atsuhime adored is the homeland for people of Kagoshima across time.

Sketch 13: Atsuhime’s Journey to Edo
 In the fall of 1853, Atsuhime dropped by Kyoto on the way to Edo. During her stay, she met with Konoe Tadahiro. Konoe, a Kuge, had a strong tie with Satsuma, since he married Nariakira’s elder sister as his primary wife. Tōfuku-ji Sokusōin, where Atsuhime visited for worshiping, was the temple where the Shimazu clan worshiped their ancestors tracing back to the Muromachi period. After spending roughly one week, she left for Edo with full of expectations and worries.

Sketch 14: Ii Naosuke's Homeland
Hikone, Shiga
 Ii Naosuke, who later played a significant role as a Tairō in the late Edo period, was born in 1815 as a son of the head of the Hikone domain. Although he was the 14th boy, coupled with his brothers’ untimely deaths, he was surprisingly chosen to head the domain at the age of 36. It was the Hikone domain that was guarding Uraga Bay when Commodore Perry came to demand Japan’s opening. Ii, who recognized the immense military power of the US, asserted the importance of opening the country. Afterwards, he antagonized with Tokugawa Nariaki over foreign policy.

Sketch 15: The Temple Remembered in Connection with Saigō Takamori
 <Meguro, Tokyo>
 Ryūsenji, also known as Meguro Fudōson, is a temple that is closely connected to Saigō Takamori. According to the temple’s historical recount, it was established in the Heian period and was bustled with visitors during the Edo period. In 1854, the Satsuma domain met with an unfortunate turn of events, Nariakira's illness and his fifth son’s sudden death. Saigō wrote in a letter to his friend that he paid homage at the temple for Nariakira’s health. Under Nariakira, who recovered his health, Saigō lived through the tumult years of the late Edo period.

Sketch 16: Birth Place of Yoshinobu
The Mito Domain Edo Residence Historical Site (Koishikawa Kōrakuen Garden) <Chiyoda, Tokyo>
 Koishikawa Kōrakuen Garden is a place where the Mito Tokugawa family had their Edo residence up till the beginning of the Meiji period. In 1938, one boy was born in this residence, later known as 15th Tokugawa Shogun Yoshinobu. He was a smart boy, and it caught Tokugawa Ieyoshi's eyes and was adopted to the Hitotsubashi Tokugawa House, one of the Gosankyō. Yoshinobu, whom even Nariakira was pushing for the next Shogun, was later going to run into Atsuhime.

Sketch 17: The Satsuma Domain Residence in Edo
The Satsuma Domain Residence Historic Site <Shibuya, Tokyo and Minato, Tokyo>
 It has been said that central Edo has five residences of the Satsuma Domain during the final years of the Edo period. The place located in current Shiba in Minato-ward was the center of the domain's activity. Atsuhime also stayed here for close to two years. In the aftermath of the Ansei great earthquakes, however, the residence was destroyed, and Atsuhime was relocated to a residence in Shibuya. The following year, she moved to Edo castle to marry the shogun.

Sketch 18: The Port Town where Harris Stayed
 <Shimoda, Shizuoka>
 Townsend Harris visited Shimoda as the first Consul General of the US to secure trade between Japan and the US in 1856, three years after Commodore Perry's arrival to the country. He opened the first U.S. Consulate at Gyokusen-ji, which is located close to the port and worked on negotiating the "Treaty of Peace and Commerce,” or the Harris Treaty, signed in 1858. Having stayed in Shimoda for nearly three years, Harris left his traces, the “Harris path,” where he used to take a walk, and a stone tablet that commemorates his stay.

Sketch 19: The Castle where Atsuhime Stayed
Kōkyo Higashigoen and Ōtemon <Chiyoda, Tokyo>
 Kōkyo Higashigoen was the location where the donjon of Edo castle was located. It’s been said that the guard of the castle was tight with the main entrance, Ōtemon, and other three gates leading to the donjon. Ōoku, where Atsuhime was staying, was located within this donjon whose area covered 40,000 tsubo. Atsuhime faced the tumultuous end of the Tokugawa shogunate in this castle.

Sketch 40: Hamaguri Gate
The  <Kyoto City>
 On July 19th, 1864, the Chōshū domain attacked the Kyoto Imperial Palace. Later, this rebellion later became known as the Jinmon Incident. The Shogunate force guarding the palace was, at one point, overwhelmed by the Chōshū forces. The Satsuma forces led by Saigō Takamori came for reinforcement and turned the tables.
 It was said that Komatsu Tatewaki, who attacked Tenryū-ji, where the Chōshū forces’ headquarters was located, distributed to commoners who suffered from fires from the war the rice that was left in the temple by the enemy forces. In the wake of this battle, Satsuma’s influence in Kyoto became further strengthened.

Sketch 41: Satchō Alliance
The Nihonmatsu Satsuma Domain Residence Historic Site <Kyoto, Kyoto>
 It has been said that the place where the Satsuma-Chōshū Alliance was formed was this house in Kyoto owned by the Komatsu family. Since the Chōshū Domain, which fought with the Tokugawa shogunate in the Kinmon Incident, was unable to purchase weapons from the western powers, it sought assistance to the Satsuma domain in supplying weapons. Tatewaki's acceptance of this plea led to obtaining the trust of Katsura Kogorō and other Chōshū samurai. In the end, the alliance was formed between the two domains.

TV schedule

Highlight

Home media
The first 27 episodes of the Atsuhime series were released by Geneon Entertainment in a 7-disc DVD box set on December 19, 2008. A second DVD box set for the remaining episodes was later released by the same company (renamed Geneon Universal) on March 25, 2009.

Soundtrack and books

Soundtrack
Atsuhime NHK Taiga Drama Original Soundtrack (Release date: February 20, 2008)
Atsuhime NHK Taiga Drama Original Soundtrack Vol. 2 (Release date: October 29, 2008)
Best Soundtracks 〜篤姫BEST and More〜 (Release date: August 5, 2009)

Books
Official guide
NHK Taiga Drama Story Atsuhime First part  (December 20, 2007)
NHK Taiga Drama Story Atsuhime Latter part  (June 30, 2008)
NHK Taiga Drama Story Atsuhime Last part  (October 2008)
NHK Taiga Drama, Historical handbook, Atsuhime  (December 2007)
NHK Taiga Drama, Atsuhime Complete Guidebook  (December 20, 2007)

International broadcast
It aired in Thailand on TPBS from August 13 to December 4, 2009, with reruns on same channel from January 30 to July 30, 2011.

References

External links
NHK website
NHK Kagoshima site. Archived from the original on January 26, 2009.

Taiga drama
2008 Japanese television series debuts
2008 Japanese television series endings
Television shows based on Japanese novels
Television series set in the 1830s
Television series set in the 1840s
Television series set in the 1850s
Television series set in the 1860s
Cultural depictions of Tokugawa Yoshinobu
Television shows set in Kagoshima Prefecture